The Swedish Engineer Troops (I) is the engineer branch of the Swedish Army. The Troops were formed after the Defence Act of 1936. Today, it consists of a single unit, the Göta Engineer Regiment (Ing 2) and two schools, the Swedish Army Field Work School (Fältarbetsskolan, FarbS) and the EOD School (Amröjskolan, AmröjS)

History
In the 1600s and 1700s, special engineer (or pioneer units) were organized. Fortifikationen ("Royal Engineers") were established in 1635 as a special corps for construction of fortifications. The task of Fortifikationen was to build and maintain the country's land and coastal fortifications and other military buildings. In 1811, the Fortifikationen was amalgamated with the Field Surveying Corps (Fältmätningskåren) to the Engineer Corps (Ingenjörskåren). This consisted, among other things, of a fortification brigade. In 1867 the Engineer Corps was renamed the Fortifikationen. From 1855, sapper companies, a pontoon battalion, a field-signaling company and engineer troops were added to the Fortifikationen. The service branch expanded greatly towards the late 1800s, and in 1901 there were four corps; the Svea Engineer Corps (Ing 1), Göta Engineer Corps (Ing 2), Field Telegraph Corps (Ing 3), and Boden Engineer Corps (Ing 4).

According to the Defence Act of 1925, the Swedish Engineer Troops now came to consist of two field engineering corps (Svea and Göta, located in Stockholm and Eksjö), the Field Telegraph Corps (Stockholm) and Boden Engineer Corps. Svea Engineer Corps was organized on a corps staff, two field engineering companies, two military bridge companies, a fortress engineering company (Vaxholm) and a ordnance (sapper) company. Göta Engineer Corps was organized on a corps staff, three field engineering companies, a military bridge company, a fortress engineering company (Karlskrona) and a ordnance (sapper) company. The Field Telegraph Corps was organized on corps staff, two field telegraph companies, two radio companies and an ordnance company. The Boden Engineer Corps was organized on a corps staff, a field engineering company, a fortress engineering company, a military bridge company, a telegraph company and a ordnance (sapper) company.

The Swedish Engineer Troops constituted after the Defence Act of 1936 a special service branch, including three engineer corps: Svea Engineer Corps (Ing 1) in Solna, Göta Engineer Corps (Ing 2) in Eksjö and Boden Engineer Corps (Ing 4, later Ing 3) in Boden. It was established when the Fortifikationen was split into the Swedish Engineer Troops, Swedish Army Signal Troops and the Swedish Fortification Corps. A school to train officers in the engineer troops and to train other officers in the field working service was established in 1943 under the name Engineer Troop School (Ingenjörtruppskolan, IngS). It changed its name in 1952 to the Swedish Army School of Field Works (Arméns fältarbetsskola, FältarbS). On 1 June 1981 the Swedish Engineers [Cadet and] Officer Candidate School (Ingenjörtruppernas kadett- och aspirantskola, IngKAS) was amalgamated with the Swedish Army School of Field Works. It ceased and was part of the Swedish Army Field Works Center (Arméns fältarbetscentrum, FarbC) from 1 July 1991.

The Swedish Army Field Works Center was disbanded in 1997 and the Swedish Army Field Work School (Fältarbetsskolan, FarbS) continued operations together with the EOD School (Amröjskolan, AmröjS), both sorting under Göta Engineer Regiment (Ing 2) which since 2005 is the only remaining active engineer unit in the Swedish Engineer Troops.

Units

Inspector of the Swedish Engineer Troops
The head of the Engineer Troops was called Ingenjörinspektören ("Inspector of the Swedish Engineer Troops"). In the years 1966-1991, the Engineer Troops and the Signal Troops had a joint branch inspector; the Inspector of the Swedish Army Engineer Corps and Signal Corps (Ingenjörinspektör- och Signalinspektören). From 1991, the two branches received an inspector each, and the title of the engineer troops was shortened to the Engineer Inspector. In connection with the decommissioning of Swedish Army Field Work Center (Arméns fältarbetscentrum), the position of Engineer Inspector disappeared.

1937–1941: Sven Alin
1940–1941: Per (Pelle) Högstedt
1941–1946: Sigurd Rahmqvist
1946–1953: Inge Hellgren
1953–1963: Stig Berggren
1963–1967: Gunnar Smedmark
1967–1967: Harald Smith (acting)
1968–1969: Harald Smith
1969–1975: Åke Bernström
1975–1982: Kåre Svanfeldt
1982–1986: Owe Dahl
1986–1991: Bertil Lövdahl
1991–1993: Lars-Åke Persson
1993–1997: Christer Ljung
1997–1997: Björn Svensson

See also
Swedish Armoured Troops
Swedish Army Signal Troops
Swedish Army Service Troops
List of Swedish engineer regiments

Footnotes

Footnotes

References

Notes

Print

Web

Further reading

Military units and formations of the Swedish Army
Military engineer corps
Military units and formations established in 1811